Portrait of Winston Churchill may refer to:

 Portrait of Winston Churchill (Sutherland), a destroyed painting by Graham Sutherland
 The Roaring Lion, a photograph by Yousuf Karsh

See also
 Statue of Winston Churchill (disambiguation)